Crowded is an American sitcom television series that aired on NBC from March 15 to May 22, 2016. The series was created by Suzanne Martin, executive produced by Martin, Sean Hayes and Todd Milliner, through their Hazy Mills Productions, and produced in association with Universal Television. Like their other series Hot in Cleveland, this multi-camera sitcom is recorded in front of a live studio audience. The series was greenlit to order by NBC on May 7, 2015. The show debuted as a mid-season entry in the 2015–16 television season, with a 13-episode order.

On May 13, 2016, NBC cancelled the series after one season.

Premise
Mike (Patrick Warburton) and Martina Moore (Carrie Preston) put aside their plans and newfound freedom when their two adult daughters, Stella (Mia Serafino) and Shea (Miranda Cosgrove), unexpectedly move back into their Seattle home after college graduation to figure out what they will do with their lives. Mike also learns that his retired father Bob (Stacy Keach) and his stepmother Alice (Carlease Burke) have decided to stay in town to help with Stella and Shea instead of moving to Florida. The family has to learn to live together again, despite the reluctance of Mike and Martina.

Cast and characters

Main
Patrick Warburton as Mike Moore, a 47-year old helicopter pilot.
Carrie Preston as Martina Moore, a therapist.
Miranda Cosgrove as Shea Moore, the younger daughter of Mike and Martina who has a PhD in Astrophysics from MIT. She moves back in with her parents after funding for her research job was eliminated.
Mia Serafino as Stella Moore, the older daughter of Mike and Martina who has a degree in Theatre Arts. She moves back in with her parents after not being able to get acting jobs or hits on her YouTube channel.
Stacy Keach as Bob Moore, Mike's father. He is a retired police officer who runs his own bar, Bob's Blue Room.
Carlease Burke as Alice Moore, Bob's second wife and Mike's stepmother. She works as a prison security guard.

Recurring
 Clifford McGhee as Ethan Ellis, Alice's son and Mike's stepbrother. His status as a former professional golfer stems from having the yips, a deficiency he develops during his career, and has moved into the Moore household to get back on his feet. He is also shown to be interested in Shea, despite him being her stepuncle.

Guest
 David Spade as Kyle, Mike's high-school bully who has landed in jail.
 Betty White as Sandy, one of Martina's patients who moves into the Moore house and refuses to leave.
 Jane Leeves as Gwen, one of Martina's patients and Sandy's daughter.
 Carol Kane as Fake Linda, a woman who claims to be Mike's mother at one of his old addresses.
 Debra Monk as Linda Davis, Mike's mom who was hiding from the law in Bob's cabin.

Episodes

Production
On November 24, 2015, James Burrows directed an episode of the series, which was the 1,000th television episode directed by Burrows throughout his career.

Reception
Crowded received mixed reviews from critics. The review aggregator website Rotten Tomatoes reported a 35% approval rating. The website's consensus read, "A talented cast is left with no room to flourish in Crowded, a misfire whose dated feel is compounded by a pronounced lack of laughs." On Metacritic, the series scored 45 out of 100 based on 16 reviews, indicating "mixed or average reviews".

References

External links
 
 

2010s American sitcoms
2016 American television series debuts
2016 American television series endings
English-language television shows
NBC original programming
Television series by Hazy Mills Productions
Television series by Universal Television
Television shows set in Seattle
Television series about families